Joaquín Parra (d. 2022) was a Spanish film actor, fencing master and stunt performer. He played Pícaro in Yo soy la revolución (1967), Pedro Henchman in Johnny Yuma (1966), Mendoza in The Royal Hunt of the Sun (1969), and he also appeared in A Bullet for the General (1969), and Pistol for a Hundred Coffins (1968).

Filmography

References

External links
 

20th-century births
2022 deaths
Male Spaghetti Western actors
Spanish male film actors
Spanish male television actors